Wisdom of the Crowd is an American drama television series based on the Israeli series of the same name by Shira Hadad and Dror Mishani.  The series premiered on CBS October 1, 2017, and ended on January 14, 2018. The series was produced by CBS Television Studios and Universal Television.

Premise
A tech innovator creates a cutting-edge crowd-sourcing hub to solve his own daughter's murder, as well as revolutionizing crime solving in San Francisco.

Cast and characters

Main
 Jeremy Piven as Jeffrey Tanner
 Richard T. Jones as Detective Tommy Cavanaugh
 Natalia Tena as Sara Morton
 Blake Lee as Josh Novak
 Monica Potter as Alex Hale
 Jake Matthews as Tariq Bakari

Recurring
 Ramses Jimenez as Carlos Ochoa
 Malachi Weir as Mike Leigh
 Ion Overman as Elena Ruiz
 Abigail Cowen as Mia Tanner

Production
On February 9, 2017, it was announced that CBS had given the receive-a-pilot order for Wisdom of the Crowd based on the Israeli format. The episode was written and authored by Ted Humphrey, who was expected to be an executive producer, alongside Avi Nir, Alon Shtruzman, Peter Traugott, Rachel Kaplan, Dror Mishani, Shira Hadad, and Adam Davidson. Production companies involved with the pilot include Algorithm Entertainment, Keshet International, Universal Television, and CBS Television Studios. On May 12, 2017, CBS officially ordered the pilot to series. A few days later, it was announced that the series would premiere by October 1, 2017, and air on Sundays at 8:00 P.M.

On November 27, 2017, CBS opted not to order more than 13 episodes of the series and cancelled the show following the weak ratings.

Casting 
On February 27, 2017, it was reported that Jeremy Piven would play the lead role of Jeffrey Tanner. In March 2017, they have been cast were reported to be: Richard T. Jones, Blake Lee, Natalia Tena and Jake Matthews as well as Monica Potter.

On November 23, 2017, lead actor Piven was involved in allegations of sexual harassment. A day later, CBS stated that all 13 commissioned episodes had already been filmed, as shooting already wrapped up in December 2017.

Episodes

Reception
The review aggregator website Rotten Tomatoes registered an approval rating of 26% based on 19 reviews, with an average rating of 5.56/10. The site's critical consensus reads, "Wisdom of the Crowd wastes a talented cast on a formulaic procedural crime drama that wavers between modest returns and unintentional laughs." Metacritic, which uses a normalized rating, assigned a weighted average score of 35 out of 100 based on 17 critics, indicating "generally unfavorable reviews".

References

External links
 

2010s American crime drama television series
2017 American television series debuts
2018 American television series endings
American television series based on Israeli television series
English-language television shows
Television series by CBS Studios
CBS original programming
Television shows set in San Francisco
Television series about computing
Television series by Universal Television
Fictional portrayals of the San Francisco Police Department
Malware in fiction
Crowdsourcing
Television series about social media